Valtteri Moren (born 15 June 1991) is a Finnish professional footballer who plays as a defender for Veikkausliiga club HJK and represents the Finland national team. Moren was born in Vantaa, Finland. He began his senior club career playing for Klubi-04, before making his league debut for HJK at age 19 in 2010. After winning his first trophy, the Veikkausliiga, during his first season on league level, he helped HJK win five successive Veikkausliiga titles, two Cups and a League Cup. After five full seasons in HJK he was sold to Belgian First Division A side Waasland-Beveren.

Moren made his international debut for Finland in October 2013, at the age of 22.

Club career

HJK Helsinki
Moren made his debut for HJK's reserves, Klubi-04, during the 2009 season and finished the season with three appearances. During the next season he was dual-registered with both the A and B-team and made his Veikkausliiga debut against MYPA 13 June 2010.

Waasland-Beveren
In July 2015 it was announced that Moren had signed a three year contract with Waasland-Beveren. He made his Belgian First Division A debut on 22 August 2015 in a match against Mouscron when he replaced Miloš Marić as a substitute on 39th minute.

Return to HJK
In July 2020, Moren returned to HJK on a deal until the end of 2022. After two matches in the Klubi-04 reserve team he debuted in HJK on 18 August 2020 in a match against Haka.

International career
Moren made his debut for the Finnish national team on 30 October 2013 in a friendly match in Qualcomm Stadium, San Diego against Mexico when he replaced Jarkko Hurme as a substitute on 62nd minute. He scored his first goal for national team in 2014 Baltic Cup in a 2-0 victory match against Estonia. Moren was called up for four matches in the UEFA Euro 2016 qualifications but he remained as an unused substitute.

Career statistics

Club

International

International goals
Scores and results list Finland's goal tally first.

Honours

Club
HJK Helsinki
 Finnish championship: 2010, 2011, 2012, 2013, 2014, 2020
 Finnish Cup: 2011, 2014, 2020
 Finnish League Cup: 2015

International
Finland national football team
2014 Baltic Cup Bronze

References

External links

 Waasland-Beveren official profile 
 Valtteri Moren – SPL competition record
 
 
 

1991 births
Living people
Association football central defenders
Finnish footballers
Finland youth international footballers
Finland under-21 international footballers
Finland international footballers
Finnish expatriate footballers
Klubi 04 players
FC Kiffen 08 players
Helsingin Jalkapalloklubi players
Veikkausliiga players
S.K. Beveren players
Belgian Pro League players
Expatriate footballers in Belgium
Finnish expatriate sportspeople in Belgium
Sportspeople from Vantaa